Nirvana in Fire 2 is a 2017 Chinese television series starring Huang Xiaoming, Liu Haoran, Tong Liya and Zhang Huiwen. It is the sequel to Nirvana in Fire, which is based on Hai Yan's novel with the same name. The stories take place after the events of the original series, which revolves around the Langya Hall. The series aired on Dragon TV and Beijing TV from December 18, 2017 to February 12, 2018.

Although the series has earned a Douban score of 8.5 from more than 144,766 user reviews, Nirvana in Fire 2 did not achieve the same success in ratings compared to the first season. Some cited the show's slow start and detached nature from first season's plot/characters as reasons for its lower popularity.

Synopsis
During the chaotic Northern and Southern Dynasties, the northern frontier of the Liang Dynasty is protected by the powerful Changlin Army led by Xiao Tingsheng (Sun Chun) and Xiao Pingzhang (Huang Xiaoming). During an expedition, Grand Secretary Xun Baishui (Bi Yanjun) cuts off supplies to the front line, and Xiao Pingzhang becomes severely wounded as he leads the defense on Liang's northern border. His younger brother, Xiao Pingjing (Liu Haoran), leaves Langya Pavilion to visit him. There, Xiao Pingzhang and his father, Xiao Tingsheng, send Xiao Pingjing to where the supply ships sank in order to get to the bottom of the conspiracy. Unbeknownst to Xiao Pingjing, Xiao Tingsheng and his friend, Master Li, also send Lin Xi (Zhang Huiwen) to the same city, so that she can assist Xiao Pingjing.

It turns out that 30 years ago, Ye Qin, a neighboring kingdom, was suffering from the plague, yet Liang kept its borders shut for self-protection. In order to take revenge for his fallen kingdom, Puyang Ying (Guo Jingfei) travels to Liang under a hidden identity, and colludes with top martial artist the Marquis of Mozi (Cheng Taishen) and Xun Baishui to weaken the Xiao Family’s power. To exact revenge, he tricks the Empress into mandating an order to poison two cities in Liang, thereby recreating the conditions of the plague his kingdom suffered from.

Xiao Pingzhang dies from Puyang Ying's poison during the war, and a year later, the Liang Emperor (Liu Jun) passes away from sickness. His son, Xiao Yuanshi ascends the throne as a child emperor guided by Xiao Tingsheng. The Yu Dynasty takes the chance to gather forces to invade, and Xiao Pingjing plans a preemptive attack to defeat the Yu's army. Learning of these plans from Xiao Yuanqi, Xun Baishui coaxes the new Emperor (Hu Xianxu) into releasing an edict banning the Changlin Army from going into battle. Xiao Pingjing violates the edict, and he destroys Yu's army, ensuring that Liang would be safe from the Yu in the north. Upon his return to the capital, Xiao Pingjing's father, Xiao Tingsheng passes away due to his deteriorating health. Xiao Pingjing finally succumbs to the grief caused by the death of his brother and his father, and he leaves the capital to return to Langya Pavilion.

Years go by and Xiao Yuanqi begins to gain recognition and power from defeating the Donghai Army and reclaiming 7 of 10 eastern areas that were captured. In reality, those victories were planned by the Marquis of Mozi, who became the ruler of the Donghai. The Marquis of Mozi coordinated with Xiao Yuanqi so that Xiao Yuanqi could gain recognition from creating the impression that he recaptured lost territories for the Liang. After using assassins sent by Marquis of Mozi to kill Grand Secretary Xun Baishui, Xiao Yuanqi severs his relationship with the Marquis of Mozi by killing all the assassins that the Marquis of Mozi have sent to help him. Without Xun Baishui to rival his influence in the capital, Xiao Yuanqi stages a rebellion against Xiao Yuanshi. Xiao Pingjing predicts the danger against Yuanshi and he gathers the disbanded Changlin Army to march on Yuanqi's army that has occupied the capital and taken Yuanshi hostage. Ultimately, Pingjing defeats Yuanqi, and Pingjing leaves the capital to live his life with Lin Xi.

Cast

Main 
 Huang Xiaoming as Xiao Pingzhang
 Liu Haoran as Xiao Pingjing
 Tong Liya as Meng Qianxue
 Zhang Huiwen as Lin Xi
 Wu Haochen as Xiao Yuanqi, Marquis Laiyang

Supporting
Liang Imperial Family
 Liu Jun as the Emperor
 Mei Ting as Empress Xun
 Hu Xianxu as Xiao Yuanshi, Crown Prince
 Sun Chun as Xiao Tingsheng, Prince Changlin
 Li Bin as Xiao Jingting, Prince Ning
 Wen Jing as Consort Shu
 Liu Lin as Princess Dowager Laiyang
 Qiao Xin as Xun Anru

Liang Imperial Court
 Zhang Bo as Xun Feizhan
 Bi Yanjun as Xun Baishui
 Guo Jingfei as Puyang Ying
 You Yong as Song Fu
 Yue Yang as Prefect Zhang
 Feng Qian as Li Gu
 Xia Fan as Dong Qing
 Dong Yuelin as Ji Chen
 Jin Zehao as Yue Yinchuan
 Zhang Juanyi as Tan Heng
 Chen Muyang as Di Ming
 Shao Weitong as He Cheng

Others
 Cheng Taishen as Marquis Mozi
 Wang Qingxiang as Lin Chen
 Jia Yuanyuan as Head Aunt
 Zhang Yanyan as Sister Yun
 Zhang Haowei as Lin Jiu
 Wang Yongquan as Old Master Li
 Feng Hui as Lin Shen
 Xing Minshan as Duan Tongzhou
 Wei Zhi as Prince Hui
 Zhao Da as Tuoba Yu
 Shi Shi as Princess Tuoba Chonghua
 Jin Song as Qin Lingshuo, Prince Kang
 Tan Kai as Ruan Ying
 Zhu Mengyao as Pei'er
 Chao Haowei as Lu Zhao
 Zhang Lingxin as Lady Qi

Production 
In early 2016, producer Hou Hongliang had confirmed though interviews that a sequel to Nirvana in Fire would probably include a new cast of characters and story, while retaining the backdrop of Langya Hall. Wei Wei, the Nirvana in Fire casting director, confirmed on Sina Weibo in July 2016 that a sequel to the acclaimed drama had entered pre-production and would began filming in November. The series is set to air exclusively via streaming website iQiyi. The main cast was unveiled in October 2016, with the rest of the supporting cast announced later in December.

On December 15, the cast and production crew officially began filming at Hengdian Studios. Filming lasted for 5 months and ended in May 2017 at Mongolia before finally entering post-production.

In March 2017, Daylight Entertainment announced that the series would be showcased at the Entertainment Expo Hong Kong. The first teaser video was unveiled in June 2017 via iQiyi's conference, with an estimated premiere date at the end of 2017.

Original soundtrack

The Nirvana in Fire 2 OST album was released on January 8, 2018, with music composed by Meng Ke, season 1's main composer, and Lu Liang. The drama's theme song "Qing Ping Yuan (清平愿)", which was composed by Dong Suoda and written by Hai Yan, was not included in the album.

Awards and nominations

References

External links 
 Nirvana In Fire 2 on Weibo
 

Nirvana in Fire
Sequel television series
Television series by Daylight Entertainment
Television series by iQiyi Pictures
2017 Chinese television series debuts
Dragon Television original programming
Beijing Television original programming
Chinese wuxia television series
Television series set in the Northern and Southern dynasties